Gabby Levy is an Israeli diplomat who served as Ambassador to Turkey until he was expelled in 2011 “in the aftermath of last year’s deadly Israeli raid on a Turkish ship leading an aid flotilla to Gaza.”  He also served as Ambassador to Australia.

References

Ambassadors of Israel to Turkey
Ambassadors of Israel to Australia
Year of birth missing (living people)
Living people